Paolo Canè (born 9 April 1965) is a former tennis player from Italy.

Canè turned professional in 1983. During his career, he won three top-level singles titles (Bordeaux in 1986, Båstad in 1989, and Bologna in 1991) and achieved much success at the Olympics, reaching the semi-finals in 1984 (when it was a demonstration event) and the quarter-finals in 1988. He also won three tour doubles titles (Bologna in 1985, and Bologna and Palermo in 1986).

Canè's career-high rankings were World No. 26 in singles (in 1989) and World No. 43 in doubles (in 1985). He retired from the professional ATP Tour in 1995.

ATP career titles

Singles (3 titles, 2 runner-ups)

Doubles (3 titles, 5 runner-ups)

External links 
 
 
 

1965 births
Hopman Cup competitors
Italian male tennis players
Living people
Olympic tennis players of Italy
Sportspeople from Bologna
Tennis players at the 1984 Summer Olympics
Tennis players at the 1988 Summer Olympics
20th-century Italian people